Mount Peale is the highest point in the La Sal Mountains of San Juan County, in the southeastern part of Utah, United States. It is also the highest point in Utah outside the Uinta Mountains. The summit is the highest point in the Manti-La Sal National Forest and the Mount Peale Research Natural Area. Mount Peale was named for Albert Peale, a mineralogist on the Hayden Survey of 1875.

The La Sal Mountains sit on the arid Colorado Plateau, near such famous desert landmarks as Canyonlands National Park and Arches National Park. However, due to their height, the La Sals are heavily forested and usually snow-capped until early summer (there is one snowfield on the north side that usually lasts year round).

La Sal Pass is accessed from the southeast via a graded gravel road. The route often involves some travel on snow, even in summer.

See also
 List of Ultras of the United States

References

External links

Peale
Mountains of San Juan County, Utah
Manti-La Sal National Forest